Ruslan Valeryevich Zayerko (born 27 June 1993) is a Russian football midfielder.

Career

Club
Zayerko made his debut in the Russian Second Division for FC Strogino Moscow on 15 July 2013 in a game against FC Torpedo Vladimir.
 
On 4 August 2019, Zayerko signed for Lori FC.

References

External links
 
 

1993 births
People from Rossoshansky District
Living people
Russian footballers
Association football midfielders
Russian expatriate footballers
Expatriate footballers in Belarus
Expatriate footballers in Armenia
Russian Second League players
Armenian Premier League players
FC Torpedo Moscow players
FC Luch Vladivostok players
FC Nizhny Novgorod (2015) players
FC Lida players
FC Lori players
FC Sokol Saratov players
FC Strogino Moscow players
Sportspeople from Voronezh Oblast